The 2021–22 Washington Huskies men's basketball team represented the University of Washington in the 2021–22 NCAA Division I men's basketball season. The Huskies, led by fifth-year head coach Mike Hopkins, played their home games at Alaska Airlines Arena at Hec Edmundson Pavilion in Seattle, Washington as members of the Pac-12 Conference.

Previous season
The Huskies finished the 2020–21 season 5–21, 4–16 in Pac-12 play to finish in twelfth place. The Huskies as the 12th seed lost to Utah in a first round game of the Pac-12 tournament. Assistant coaches Cameron Dollar and Dave Rice left the program after the season ended.

Offseason

Departures

Incoming transfers

2021 recruiting class

Roster

Schedule and results

|-
!colspan=12 style=|Exhibition

|-
!colspan=12 style=|Regular season

|- 
!colspan=12 style=| PAC-12 Tournament

Rankings

References

Washington Huskies men's basketball seasons
Washington
Washington Huskies basketball, men
Washington Huskies basketball, men
Washington Huskies basketball, men
Washington Huskies basketball, men